Raymond Galligan (born 30 May 1987) is an Irish Gaelic footballer who plays for the Cavan county team. He plays his club football with Lacken.

Playing career

Club
Galligan has played with the Lacken club at all levels.

Galligan made his club debut in 2002 and was on the Lacken team that faced Drung in the final of the Cavan Intermediate Football Championship in 2004, and scored a point in their 1-9 to 1-8 win.

On 7 October 2012, Galligan captained Lacken in the Intermediate final against Cootehill. Galligan scored 1-5 from full forward as the game ended in a draw. In the replay on 13 October, Galligan scored two points in the 3-10 to 1-9 win, winning his second Intermediate title.

In 2016 Galligan captained Lacken from full forward to their first ever Division One league title, defeating Kingscourt Stars in the final.

Inter-county

Minor and under-21
Galligan represented Cavan at minor and under-21 level but had little success in either grade.

Senior
Galligan joined the senior team in 2006, making his debut as a substitute against Antrim in the Tommy Murphy Cup. Galligan kicked ten points in his National League debut against Roscommon in 2010. 

On 20 May 2012, Galligan made his Ulster championship debut as a substitute against Donegal.

Ahead of the 2015 season, Cavan manager Terry Hyland tried Galligan as a goalkeeper because of his kicking ability. Galligan credits Gary Rogers with helping him to improve the shot-stopping aspect of his game. 
On 24 May 2015, Galligan started in goal against Monaghan in the Ulster championship.

On 3 April 2016, Galligan kicked two 45s against Galway in the National League, as Cavan earned promotion to the top flight for the first time in 15 years. On 24 April, Galligan started the Division 2 Final against Tyrone, kicking a free in the five-point loss.

On 1 April 2018, Galligan started the National League Division 2 Final against Roscommon. Galligan scored a free in the 4–16 to 4–12 loss.

Galligan was named Cavan captain at the start of the 2019 season. On 23 June 2019, Galligan captained Cavan in their first Ulster Final in 18 years against Donegal. Donegal ran out winners on a 1-24 to 2-16 scoreline.

On 31 October 2020, Cavan faced Monaghan in the Ulster preliminary round. Galligan kicked a 58-metre free late in extra time as Cavan won by a single point. Galligan captained Cavan in their second successive Ulster Final on 22 November, again against Donegal. Cavan were winners by four points and Galligan became the first Cavan man since Stephen King to lift the Anglo-Celt Cup. Cavan were well beaten by Dublin at the semi-final stage. At the end of the championship, Galligan was named on The Sunday Game Team of the Year. Galligan was later selected as the goalkeeper on the All Star team.

On 2 April 2022, Galligan was in goal as Cavan faced Tipperary in the National League Division 4 final. Galligan scored a point from a 45 as Cavan were winners on a 2–10 to 0-15 scoreline.
On 28 May, Galligan kicked seven points and saved a penalty twice against Down in a first round Tailteann Cup win. Galligan started the decider against Westmeath on 9 July. Westmeath came out four-point winners on the day.

Honours
Cavan
 Ulster Senior Football Championship (1): 2020 (c)
 National Football League Division 4 (1): 2022 (c)

Lacken
 Cavan Intermediate Football Championship (2): 2004, 2012 (c)
 Cavan Division 1 League (1): 2016 (c)

Individual
 All Star Award (1): 2020
 The Sunday Game Team of the Year (1): 2020
 Ulster GAA President's Awards Footballer of the Year (1): 2020
 Irish News Ulster All-Star (2): 2016, 2020

References

1987 births
Living people
Cavan inter-county Gaelic footballers
Lacken Celtic Gaelic footballers
Gaelic football goalkeepers